Menthone is a monoterpene with a minty flavor that occurs naturally in a number of essential oils. l-Menthone (or (2S,5R)-trans-2-isopropyl-5-methylcyclohexanone), shown at right, is the most abundant in nature of the four possible stereoisomers. It is structurally related to menthol, which has a secondary alcohol in place of the carbonyl. Menthone is used in flavoring, perfume and cosmetics for its characteristic aromatic and minty odor.

Occurrence 
Menthone is a constituent of the essential oils of pennyroyal, peppermint, Mentha arvensis, Pelargonium geraniums, and others. In most essential oils, it is a minor compound; it was first synthesized by oxidation of menthol in 1881 before it was found in essential oils in 1891.

Structure and preparation 
2-Isopropyl-5-methylcyclohexanone has two asymmetric carbon centers, meaning that it can have four different stereoisomers: (2S,5S), (2R,5S), (2S,5R) and (2R,5R). The S,S and R,R stereoisomers have the methyl and isopropyl groups on the same side of the cyclohexane ring: the so-called cis conformation. These stereoisomers are called isomenthone. The trans-isomers are called menthone. Because the (2S,5R) isomer has negative optical rotation, it is called l-menthone or (−)-menthone. It is the enantiomeric partner of the (2R,5S) isomer: (+)- or d-menthone. Menthone can easily be converted to isomenthone and vice versa via a reversible epimerization reaction via an enol intermediate, which changes the direction of optical rotation, so that l-menthone becomes d-isomenthone, and d-menthone becomes l-isomenthone.

In the laboratory, l-menthone may be prepared by oxidation of menthol with acidified dichromate. If the chromic acid oxidation is performed with stoichiometric oxidant in the presence of diethyl ether as co-solvent, a method introduced by H.C. Brown, the epimerization of l-menthone to d-isomenthone is largely avoided.  If menthone and isomenthone are equilibrated at room temperature, the isomenthone content will reach 29%.  Pure l-menthone has an intensely minty clean aroma.  By contrast, d-isomenthone has a "green" note, increasing levels of which are perceived to detract from the odor quality of l-menthone.

History 
Menthone was first described by Moriya in 1881. It was then synthesized by heating menthol with chromic acid, and its structure was later confirmed by synthesizing it from 2-isopropyl-5-methylpimelic acid.

Menthone was crucial to one of the great mechanistic discoveries in organic chemistry. In 1889, Ernst Beckmann discovered that dissolving menthone in concentrated sulfuric acid gave a new ketonic material which gave an equal but opposite optical rotation to the starting material. Beckmann realized that this must result from an inversion of configuration at the asymmetric carbon atom next to the carbonyl group (at that time thought to be carbon attached to the methyl, rather than the isopropyl group), and he postulated this as happening through an intermediate enol tautomer in which the asymmetry of the carbon atom was removed when it changed from a tetrahedral to a trigonal (planar) geometry. This was an early example of the inference of an (almost) undetectable intermediate in a reaction mechanism accounting for the outcome of the reaction.

References 

Flavors
Cooling flavors
Ketones
Perfume ingredients
Monoterpenes
Isopropyl compounds
Cyclohexanes